Niculae Fulgeanu (born 31 March 1971) is a Romanian former water polo player who competed in the 1996 Summer Olympics.

References

1971 births
Living people
Romanian male water polo players
Olympic water polo players of Romania
Water polo players at the 1996 Summer Olympics